Summer's Desire is a 2010 Taiwanese drama series starring Barbie Hsu, Peter Ho and Huang Xiaoming. It is based on the novel of the same name by Ming Xiaoxi. The television series was produced by Three-Giant Production with Peter Ho as producer.

The series was first broadcast in Taiwan on free-to-air Formosa Television (FTV) from 30 May – 29 August 2010, every Sunday from 22:00 to 23:30. It was nominated for Best Marketing at the 46th Golden Bell Awards in 2011.

Synopsis
Yin Xiamo and Luo Xi are orphans, both having met each other at their adoptive parents’ home. Because of the shadows remaining from their childhood, they are both shrouded in the midst of wariness. However, when Xia Mo and her brother meet an embarrassing situation during a singing competition, Luo Xi helps them out, and the iciness that separates both of them gradually melts. Seeing what has happened, as well as in an attempt to break both of them up, Ou Chen, who deeply loves Xia Mo and is the heir to the company that founded their school, sends Luo Xi to England to study.

Five years later, Luo Xi has become a superstar, with a countless number of fans to his name. Xia Mo having become an orphan once again as her adoptive parents died the year Luo Xi left, is a new artist of a records company and meets Luo Xi. Ou Chen on the other hand, having lost his memory of Xia Mo five years ago due to a car accident, also sees Xia Mo once again as well. With all three main characters back on the scene and their disputes of love and hate, what will happen between them then? Who will Xia Mo pick in the end?

Cast

Main
 Barbie Hsu as Yin Xiamo
 Peter Ho as Ou Chen
 Huang Xiaoming as Luo Xi

Supporting

 Kris Shen as Yin Cheng
Serena Fang as Jiang Zhenen 
Chang Kuo-chu as Xi Meng 
 Fu Peici as young Xia Mo
 Wang Zhengwei as young Luo Xi
 Chen Lingzhen as young Ouchen
Canti Lau as Xia Yingbo
Patina Lin as Shen Qiang
Ke Huanru as Pan Nan 
Maggie Wu as An Huini
Yang Ko-han as Ling Hao
Coco Jiang as Wei An 
Liu Shuting as Yao Shu'er
Huang Yi as Luo Xi's mother
Chen Chen as Jie Ni
Deng Ning as A Sen
Zhao Shun as Yin's father
Ying Cailing as Yin's mother
Zhang Kefan as Jam
Lin Mei-hsiu as Cai Ni
Irene Xu as Fang Jinhua
Qi Wei as Ou Chen's fake girlfriend
Yue Yaoli as Ou Chen's grandfather
Blackie Chen as Host
 as Host
Francesca Kao as Luna

Soundtrack

International broadcast
In Japan, the drama was aired on cable channel DATV with Japanese subtitles from 16 May – 31 October 2011 for 24 episodes.

References

External links
FTV Summer's Desire official homepage

2010 Taiwanese television series debuts
2010 Taiwanese television series endings
Formosa Television original programming
Gala Television original programming
Television shows based on manhua
Television shows based on Chinese novels
Summer's Desire